Lake Orta (Lombard and ) or Cusio (Lombard and) is a lake in northern Italy, west of Lake Maggiore.

It has been so named since the 16th century, but was previously called Lago di San Giulio, after Saint Julius (4th century), the patron saint of the region.

Its scenery is characteristically Italian, while San Giulio island  has some picturesque buildings, and takes its name from the local saint, who lived in the 4th century.

Located around the lake are Orta San Giulio, built on a peninsula projecting from the east shore of the lake, Omegna at its northern extremity, Pettenasco to the east, and Pella to the west.

It is supposed that the lake is the remnant of a much larger sheet of water by which originally the waters of the Toce flowed south towards Novara. As the glaciers retreated the waters flowing from them diminished, and were gradually diverted into Lake Maggiore.

The inaugural European Rowing Championships were held on Lake Orta in 1893.

Frequent ferry service connects towns and villages around the lake.

Gallery

See also
Italian Lakes

References

CNR - ISE: Laghi  
LIMNO Banca dati dei laghi italiani: Orta

External links
 Lake Orta at World lake database 
 
 Orta.net  Pictures, history and curiosities about lake of Orta